Michael Wesley Redd (born August 24, 1979) is an American former professional basketball player. He was drafted 43rd overall by the Milwaukee Bucks in the 2000 NBA draft. He was born in Columbus, Ohio, where he attended West High School. He was also a member of the U.S. national basketball team.

Early life and education
Redd was born on August 24, 1979, in Columbus, Ohio. In his college years, Redd spent three years leading the offensive attack of Ohio State University garnering point averages of 21.9, 19.5, and 17.5, respectively. As a sophomore, Redd and Scoonie Penn led Ohio State to the NCAA Final Four. He was then drafted after his junior year in the 2000 NBA draft as a second round pick (43rd overall) by the Milwaukee Bucks.

Professional career

Milwaukee Bucks (2000–2011)
In his rookie year, Redd was not able to contribute immediately as he was behind NBA All-Star guard Ray Allen on the depth chart. Later on, however, it became apparent that he was better than anticipated as proven by accounts that he had played extremely well against Ray Allen, Glenn Robinson, and other teammates in practice. It was then that former Bucks' head coach George Karl rewarded him with additional playing time. He posted averages of 11.4 points per contest as well as 44.4% on three-point shooting during his second NBA season. On February 20, 2002, against the Houston Rockets, Redd made eight three-point field goals in the fourth quarter, a then-NBA record. In October 2002, he signed a four-year, $12 million offer sheet with the Dallas Mavericks, but it was matched by the Bucks and he remained in Milwaukee. During the 2003–04 season, Redd's performance, amongst other reasons (ouster of Ray Allen to Seattle via a trade), was rewarded with full starter's duties and later earning averages of 21.7 points per contest en route to his first and only All-Star Game appearance.

After the 2004–05 season, Redd signed a new contract with the Bucks that lasted six years and was worth $91 million. He chose to stay with the Bucks over leaving for his home state team, the Cleveland Cavaliers, and a chance to play for less money with LeBron James.

In the 2006–07 season, Redd arguably had the best season of his career, averaging a career-high 26.7 points per game. That season, on November 11, 2006, Redd scored a career-high 57 points in a 113-111 loss to the Utah Jazz, breaking the single-game Bucks record for points scored set by Kareem Abdul-Jabbar in 1971. Later that season, on March 4, 2007, Redd scored 52 points in an overtime loss to the Chicago Bulls. Despite his efforts, the Bucks struggled to win games, finishing 28–54 in the season.

The Milwaukee Bucks were dealt a devastating blow January 25, 2009, when they learned Redd would miss the rest of the season with a torn ACL and MCL in his left knee. Redd missed the rest of the 2008–09 season.

Redd returned for the Bucks to start the 2009–10 season, but during a game against the Los Angeles Lakers on January 10, 2010, he re-tore his ACL and MCL in the same knee that he had injured almost a year earlier. It was announced the next day that he would once again be lost for the rest of the season.

On March 28, 2011, Redd was able to return to the Bucks after 14 months from the injury and recorded four assists in his return. On March 30, 2011, against the Toronto Raptors, Redd scored his first NBA basket since his return from injury. Redd played 10 games in the 2010–11 season. When he left Milwaukee, he had averaged 20 points per game in his 11 seasons with the team.

Phoenix Suns (2011–2012)
The Phoenix Suns signed Redd to a one-year contract on December 29, 2011. Redd made his debut for Phoenix on January 12, 2012, scoring 14 points in a loss to the Cavaliers. Redd returned to Milwaukee on February 7, 2012, scoring 14 points in the win over the Bucks. He received a standing ovation from the crowd. On March 18, 2012, Redd scored a season-high 25 points in a victory against the Houston Rockets. In his final NBA game on April 25, 2012, he scored 14 points in a 110–106 loss to the San Antonio Spurs.

Retirement
On November 6, 2013, Redd announced his retirement from the NBA. In his retirement Redd has become an accomplished entrepreneur and venture capitalist. He also has a popular podcast called Betting On Yourself.

In 2021, Redd was one of only three former Bucks players (Brandon Jennings and Marques Johnson) to appear in Milwaukee’s championship parade.

National team career

Redd frequently played for Team USA at the junior level and played in the 2007 FIBA Americas tournament, a qualifying tournament for the 2008 Summer Olympics. He averaged over 15 points throughout the competition. During the team's game against Puerto Rico, Redd set the qualifying record for most 3-pointers made in one game. He also set the record of most three-pointers made in the whole tournament (28) surpassing Penny Hardaway who had the previous record of 22. Redd participated in the 2008 Olympics as the team went unbeaten on the way to winning back the gold medal after defeating 2006 FIBA World Championship winners Spain and living up to their "Redeem Team" moniker after missing out on gold in the 2004 Summer Olympics.

Personal life
Redd, a devout Christian, bought a church building for his father's ministry as the first purchase after signing his contract worth $91 million over six years. The church was newly named Philadelphia Deliverance Church of Christ built in his hometown of Columbus.

Redd, via NCT Ventures, invested in Azoti, an Ohio startup that connects producers and buyers of food.

Redd lives in New Albany, Ohio.

In pop culture

Rapper Nelly name-dropped Redd along with fellow NBA players Magic Johnson, Kareem Abdul-Jabbar, Shaquille O'Neal, and Allen Iverson—as well as NFL players Julius Peppers, Ray Lewis, and Peyton Manning—in the song "Heart of a Champion," the first track on 2004 album Sweat. Early in the song's second verse, Nelly says: "... I get Buck like Michael Redd--tell 'em again: I gets Buck like Michael Redd. Heard what I said?" Upon Peppers' surefire election to the Pro Football Hall of Fame once eligible, Redd would be the only athlete name-dropped in the song who did not make his sport's hall of fame.

Accomplishments
 All-NBA Third Team: 2004
 NBA All-Star: 2004
 Held NBA record for most three-point field goals made in one quarter with 8 in the fourth quarter (February 20, 2002 vs. Houston Rockets); since broken by Klay Thompson on January 23, 2015.
 5th on Milwaukee Bucks all-time points list, 5th in Milwaukee Bucks all-time scoring avg.
 Won the 1998, 1999, and 2000 Ohio State Most Valuable Player awards.
 Was 1999–00 All-Big Ten First Team in college.
 Scored a playoff career-high of 40 points against the Detroit Pistons on April 29, 2006.
 Named to the USA Olympic basketball team.
 Gold medal with Team USA, 2007 FIBA Americas Championship
 Gold medal with Team USA, 2008 Summer Olympic Games
 Scored a career-high and Milwaukee Bucks franchise record 57 points against the Utah Jazz on November 11, 2006.

NBA career statistics

Regular season

|-
| style="text-align:left;"|
| style="text-align:left;"|Milwaukee
| 6 || 0 || 5.8 || .263 || .000 || .500 || .7 || .2 || .2 || .0 || 2.2
|-
| style="text-align:left;"|
| style="text-align:left;"|Milwaukee
| 67 || 8 || 21.1 || .483 || .444 || .791 || 3.3 || 1.4 || .6 || .1 || 11.4
|-
| style="text-align:left;"|
| style="text-align:left;"|Milwaukee
| 82 || 14 || 28.2 || .469 || .438 || .805 || 4.5 || 1.4 || 1.2 || .2 || 15.1
|-
| style="text-align:left;"|
| style="text-align:left;"|Milwaukee
| 82 || 82 || 36.8 || .440 || .350 || .868 || 5.0 || 2.3 || 1.0 || .1 || 21.7
|-
| style="text-align:left;"|
| style="text-align:left;"|Milwaukee
| 75 || 75 || 38.0 || .441 || .355 || .854 || 4.2 || 2.3 || .8 || .1 || 23.0
|-
| style="text-align:left;"|
| style="text-align:left;"|Milwaukee
| 80 || 80 || 39.1 || .450 || .395 || .877 || 4.3 || 2.9 || 1.2 || .1 || 25.4
|-
| style="text-align:left;"|
| style="text-align:left;"|Milwaukee
| 53 || 53 || 38.4 || .465 || .382 || .829 || 3.7 || 2.3 || 1.2 || .2 || 26.7
|-
| style="text-align:left;"|
| style="text-align:left;"|Milwaukee
| 72 || 71 || 37.5 || .442 || .362 || .820 || 4.3 || 3.4 || .9 || .2 || 22.7
|-
| style="text-align:left;"|
| style="text-align:left;"|Milwaukee
| 33 || 32 || 36.5 || .455 || .366 || .814 || 3.2 || 2.7 || 1.1 || .1 || 21.2
|-
| style="text-align:left;"|
| style="text-align:left;"|Milwaukee
| 18 || 12 || 27.3 || .352 || .300 || .712 || 3.0 || 2.2 || 1.1 || .1 || 11.9
|-
| style="text-align:left;"|
| style="text-align:left;"|Milwaukee
| 10 || 0 || 13.4 || .400 || .235 || 1.000 || .8 || 1.2 || .2 || .1 || 4.4
|-
| style="text-align:left;"|
| style="text-align:left;"|Phoenix
| 51 || 2 || 15.1 || .400 || .318 || .793 || 1.5 || .6 || .3 || .0 || 8.2
|- class="sortbottom"
| style="text-align:center;" colspan="2"|Career
| 629 || 429 || 32.0 || .447 || .380 || .838 || 3.8 || 2.1 || .9 || .1 || 19.0
|- class="sortbottom"
| style="text-align:center;" colspan="2"|All-Star
| 1 || 0 || 15.0 || .417 || .500 || .000 || 3.0 || 2.0 || 3.0 || .0 || 13.0

Playoffs

|-
| style="text-align:left;"|2003
| style="text-align:left;"|Milwaukee
| 6 || 0 || 21.3 || .404 || .250 || .929 || 3.5 || 1.8 || .3 || .2 || 9.7
|-
| style="text-align:left;"|2004
| style="text-align:left;"|Milwaukee
| 5 || 5 || 38.4 || .410 || .300 || .762 || 5.0 || 2.6 || .0 || .0 || 18.0
|-
| style="text-align:left;"|2006
| style="text-align:left;"|Milwaukee
| 5 || 5 || 37.0 || .524 || .467 || .891 || 5.4 || 1.6 || .8 || .0 || 27.2
|- class="sortbottom"
| style="text-align:center;" colspan="2"|Career
| 16 || 10 || 31.6 || .452 || .340 || .864 || 4.6 || 2.0 || .4 || .1 || 17.8

References

External links

1979 births
Living people
African-American basketball players
American men's basketball players
Basketball players at the 2008 Summer Olympics
Basketball players from Columbus, Ohio
Medalists at the 1999 Summer Universiade
Medalists at the 2008 Summer Olympics
Milwaukee Bucks draft picks
Milwaukee Bucks players
National Basketball Association All-Stars
Ohio State Buckeyes men's basketball players
Olympic gold medalists for the United States in basketball
People from New Albany, Ohio
People from Powell, Ohio
Phoenix Suns players
Shooting guards
Small forwards
United States men's national basketball team players
Universiade gold medalists for the United States
Universiade medalists in basketball
21st-century African-American sportspeople
20th-century African-American sportspeople